Cochiti (Eastern Keresan: Kotyit [kʰocʰi̥tʰ]; Western Keresan K’úutìim’é [kʼúːtʰìːm̰é], Navajo: Tǫ́ʼgaaʼ /tʰṍʔkɑ̀ːʔ/) is a census-designated place (CDP) in Sandoval County, New Mexico, United States. A historic pueblo of the Cochiti people, one of the Keresan Nations, it is part of the Albuquerque Metropolitan Statistical Area. The population was 528 at the 2010 census. Located 22 miles (35 km) southwest of Santa Fe, the community is listed as a historic district on the National Register of Historic Places.

Geography

Demographics

At the 2010 census, there were 528 people, 157 households and 127 families residing in the CDP. The population density was 440 per square mile (169.9/km). There were 178 housing units at an average density of 149.9 per square mile (59.1/km). The racial makeup of the CDP was 95.1% Native American, 1.5% White, 1.3% from other races, and 2.1% from two or more races. Hispanic or Latino of any race were 6.6% of the population.

There were 157 households, of which 28% had children under the age of 18 living with them, 40.8% were married couples living together, 29.3% had a female householder with no husband present, and 19.1% were non-families. 18.5% of all households were made up of individuals, and 9.0% had someone living alone who was 65 years of age or older. The average household size was 3.36 and the average family size was 3.76.

31.8% of the population were under the age of 19, 6.4% from 20 to 24, 23.8% from 25 to 44, 20.6% from 45 to 64, and 17.4% who were 65 years of age or older. The median age was 34.5 years.

In the 2000 census, the median household income was $31,875 and the median family income was $37,500. Males had a median income of $19,231 compared with $21,641 for females. The per capita income for the CDP was $9,153. About 21.4% of families and 20.9% of the population were below the poverty line, including 21.3% of those under age 18 and 11.8% of those age 65 or over.

Cochiti pueblo and Cochiti people 
The Cochiti pueblo people are a federally recognized tribe of Native Americans. According to the Keres Online Dictionary the Keresan-name for the People of Cochiti Pueblo is K’úutìim’é ("People from the Mountains, i.e. Cochiti people").

The Cochiti speak Eastern Keres, a dialect of the Keresan language, a language isolate. In the early 21st century, the Keres Children's Learning Center, an independent Keres immersion school, was founded to aid with preservation of their language and culture. It has added grades since its founding.

The pueblo administers  of reservation land and works closely with the Bureau of Land Management who has jurisdiction over Kasha-Katuwe Tent Rocks National Monument.

The pueblo celebrates the annual feast day for its patron saint, San Buenaventura, on July 14.

History 

The Cochiti people are thought to be descended from the Ancestral Puebloans (formerly known as the Anasazi). The ancestors of the Cochiti people, living in cliff dwellings at Rito de los Frijoles in present-day Bandelier National Monument, divided into two groups. One was located in the pueblo of Katishtya (later called San Felipe pueblo) in the south and the other was located in Potrero Viejo, one of the finger mesas of the Pajarito Plateau in northern central New Mexico. Approximately 12 miles northwest of the present-day Cochiti Pueblo, a temporary pueblo known as Hanut Cochiti had been established.

In 1598, Spanish conquistador, Juan de Oñate came to Cochiti Pueblo. At first, the Spaniards admired and respected the Pueblo Peoples for their Spanish-like farming techniques and villages, viewing them as equals, and opening trade. As time went on, the Spaniards attempted to assimilate Cochiti people (and other tribes) into New Spanish society. They were forced to pay taxes in crops, cotton, and work. The Spanish Catholic missionaries attacked their religion and renamed the Pueblos with Catholic saints’ names and began a program of church construction, such as the San Buenaventura Mission at Cochiti, routinely torturing the tribes for practicing their traditional religion, and forcing the them into labor and/or slavery.

The Cochiti pueblo people took part in the Pueblo Revolt of 1680, an uprising of the Native Americans against the Spaniards. When Spanish Governor Antonio de Otermin reconquered New Mexico, the tribe retreated with the other Keresan tribes of San Felipe and Santo Domingo (now called Kewa) to the Potrero Viejo. The Cochiti people remained at Potrero Viejo until 1693 when they were forced to flee Spanish Governor Don Diego de Vargas and his troops.

Art 

Potters of Cochiti and Kewa Pueblo (formerly Santo Domingo Pueblo) have made traditional pots for centuries, developing styles for different purposes and expressing deep beliefs in their designs. Since the early decades of the 20th century, these pots have been appreciated by a wider audience outside the pueblos. Continuing to use traditional techniques, in the late 20th and early 21st centuries, potters have also expanded their designs and repertoire in pottery, which has an international market.

Education
It is in the Bernalillo Public Schools district, which operates Cochiti Elementary & Middle Schools in nearby Peña Blanca, and Bernalillo High School.

Notable people from Cochiti Pueblo

 Helen Cordero, storyteller and pottery
The Herrera-Ortiz family of Cochiti Pueblo is known for their traditional pottery, as well as other forms of art.
Laurencita Herrera (1912–1984), storyteller pottery and vessels
Virgil Ortiz (born 1969), potter and designer
Inez Ortiz (1960–2008), traditional Cochiti potter
Lisa Holt (born 1980), Cochiti potter with modern influence
The Montoya-Peña family of both Cochiti Pueblo and San Ildefonso Pueblo, known for their painting
Martina Vigil Montoya (1856–1916)
Tonita Peña (1893–1949), painter
Joe Herrera (1923–2001), painter 
Diego Romero (born 1964), pottery and printmaking
 Mateo Romero (born 1966), painter

In popular culture

In 1969, a documentary film about a Native American boy's life on the Cochiti pueblo was made for Sesame Street'''s second season (1970–1971), aired on December 9, 1970. Subjects it covered included a game of shinny, making tortillas, and making necklaces out of corn for summertime sale to tourists.

 Gallery 

See also

 Cochiti Dam
 Kasha-Katuwe Tent Rocks National Monument
 National Register of Historic Places listings in Sandoval County, New Mexico

References

Further reading
 Chapman, Kenneth Milton (1977). The Pottery of Santo Domingo Pueblo: A Detailed Study of Its Decoration. School of American Research, University of New Mexico Press, Albuquerque, New Mexico, ; original published in 1936 as volume 1 of the Memoirs of the Laboratory of Anthropology 
 Verzuh, Valerie K. (2008). A River Apart: The Pottery of Cochiti and Santo Domingo Pueblos''. Museum of New Mexico Press, Santa Fe, New Mexico,

External links

 Official Pueblo de Cochiti website

Puebloan peoples
Pueblo great houses
Native American tribes in New Mexico
Federally recognized tribes in the United States
Census-designated places in Sandoval County, New Mexico
Historic districts on the National Register of Historic Places in New Mexico
History of Sandoval County, New Mexico
Albuquerque metropolitan area
Census-designated places in New Mexico
Tourist attractions in Sandoval County, New Mexico
National Register of Historic Places in Sandoval County, New Mexico
Pueblos on the National Register of Historic Places in New Mexico